The fourth season of the American television series Star Trek: Discovery follows the crew of the USS Discovery, more than 900 years after the events of Star Trek: The Original Series, as they help rebuild the United Federation of Planets following a cataclysmic event. They soon face an unprecedented space anomaly that causes destruction across the galaxy. The season was produced by CBS Studios in association with Secret Hideout and Roddenberry Entertainment, with Alex Kurtzman and Michelle Paradise serving as showrunners.

Sonequa Martin-Green stars as Michael Burnham, captain of the Discovery, along with the returning Doug Jones, Anthony Rapp, Mary Wiseman, Wilson Cruz, Blu del Barrio, David Ajala, and Tig Notaro. Active development on the season began by January 2020. More time was spent writing than previous seasons due to the COVID-19 pandemic, which inspired the space anomaly that the characters face in the season. Burnham's new role as captain is also explored following her promotion at the end of the third season. The fourth season was officially announced in October 2020, and filming took place in Toronto, Canada, from November 2020 to August 2021. New filming processes were implemented to ensure safety during the pandemic, which caused some production delays. A video wall was constructed to allow for filming in front of real-time computer-generated backgrounds.

The season premiered on the streaming service Paramount+ on November 18, 2021, and the first seven episodes were released through December 30. The remaining six episodes were released from February 10 to March 17, 2022. The season's international release on Netflix was cancelled days before the premiere to allow a 2022 debut on Paramount+ for most countries; after fan backlash, the series was made available early in some countries through Pluto TV or digital purchase. The season was estimated to have high viewership and audience demand, and received positive reviews as well as several awards and nominations. A fifth season was ordered in January 2022.

Episodes

Cast and characters

Main
 Sonequa Martin-Green as Michael Burnham
 Doug Jones as Saru
 Anthony Rapp as Paul Stamets
 Mary Wiseman as Sylvia Tilly
 Wilson Cruz as Hugh Culber
 Blu del Barrio as Adira Tal
 David Ajala as Cleveland "Book" Booker
 Tig Notaro as Jett Reno

Recurring
 Oded Fehr as Charles Vance
 Ian Alexander as Gray Tal
 Chelah Horsdal as Laira Rillak
 Tara Rosling as T'Rina
 Annabelle Wallis as the voice of Zora
 David Cronenberg as Kovich
 Shawn Doyle as Ruon Tarka
 Phumzile Sitole as Diatta Ndoye
 Hiro Kanagawa as Hirai

Notable guests
 Bill Irwin as Su'Kal
 Sonja Sohn as Gabrielle Burnham
 Rachael Ancheril as Nhan
 Stacey Abrams as the President of United Earth

Production

Development
Active development on a 13-episode fourth season of Star Trek: Discovery began by January 2020, during production on the series' third season. By March, a fifth season was also in development with the intention of production on the fourth and fifth seasons taking place back-to-back, but these plans were delayed by the COVID-19 pandemic. Pre-production on the fourth season began in Toronto, Canada, on August 17. Executive producers Alex Kurtzman and Michelle Paradise, the co-showrunners of the series, officially announced the season on October 16, the day after the third season premiered. Filming was scheduled to begin on November 2.

Writing
The series' writers room began working on the season remotely by August 2020. Pandemic-related production delays allowed them to get "quite ahead in scripts" compared to previous seasons, according to Kurtzman. He soon confirmed that all seasons after the third would continue to be set in the 32nd century. Writing for the fourth season ended in mid-May 2021, and took place entirely via Zoom so the writers room never met in person. Because they, and the rest of the world, were impacted by the pandemic during the creation of the season, the writers wanted to acknowledge it in some way without literally including a pandemic in the story. Paradise explained that Star Trek series have always reflected the real world in this way, and the season's story was designed to be a metaphor for the pandemic without being one-to-one: the main "antagonist" of the season is a giant, destructive space anomaly that the characters do not understand. To establish the impact that this anomaly can have rather than just explain how big and destructive it is, the writers chose to have it destroy the planet Kwejian—the homeworld of Cleveland "Book" Booker—in the season's first episode. This has an ongoing effect on Book throughout the season, and the writers wanted to test his relationship with protagonist Michael Burnham.

The third season ends with Burnham becoming the captain of Discovery, which star Sonequa Martin-Green said was a new beginning for the series. Paradise said the character had "grown in many ways" over the first three seasons, and the fourth would see her continue to grow as captain. The writers approached Burnhams's character arc in each episode by asking what her journey as a captain would be, and by the season finale she has learned to deal with captain-specific issues such as making tough calls and navigating political situations. The previous captain of Discovery, Saru, begins the season on his homeworld of Kaminar but eventually returns to the ship. He develops a relationship with T'Rina, the president of Ni'Var, which is a storyline that the writers decided to explore after seeing unexpected chemistry between the two characters during the third season.

Paradise said the writers always intended to form a "really lovely" family unit in the third season with Paul Stamets and Hugh Culber, a gay couple, and the non-binary Adira. This is extended to Adira's transgender boyfriend Gray, who is dead but whose consciousness is still connected to Adira. The third season promised that Gray would be "seen" by everyone, in a metaphor for representation, and the fourth season does this by transferring his consciousness into a synthetic body (the same technology that was used for Jean-Luc Picard in the first season of Star Trek: Picard). Actor Ian Alexander had a lot more "hands-on involvement" with Gray's storyline in the fourth season. Another metaphor for representation is seen in the storyline for Zora, Discovery advanced computer. She becomes sentient in the season, and is deemed to be a new lifeform that officially joins Starfleet. This is similar to the android Data in the series Star Trek: The Next Generation.

After revealing that Earth is no longer part of the United Federation of Planets in the third season, the writers knew that it would be a big moment for the series to have Earth rejoin the Federation and decided that this would be a two-season arc that concludes in the fourth-season finale. They wanted the season to explore ethical questions in a similar way to Star Trek: The Original Series and The Next Generation, to make Discovery feel more like traditional Star Trek. The season also explores the mental health struggles of some characters, which was relevant to the creative team due to the real-world impacts of the pandemic. For Species 10-C, an unknown species that created the destructive anomaly, they wanted to create a species that was unlike any seen before in Star Trek or other science fiction franchises. They especially wanted the species to be difficult to communicate with, so the characters could not rely on their universal translators, and worked with science consultant Erin Macdonald as well as METI (Messaging to Extra-Terrestrial Intelligence) to understand what the new species could be.

Casting

The season stars the returning Sonequa Martin-Green as Michael Burnham, Doug Jones as Saru, Anthony Rapp as Paul Stamets, Mary Wiseman as Sylvia Tilly, Wilson Cruz as Hugh Culber, and David Ajala as Cleveland "Book" Booker, as well as Blu del Barrio reprising their recurring guest role as Adira Tal from the third season. Tig Notaro was asked to reprise her recurring guest role of Jett Reno in the season for two different filming blocks. She chose not to travel to Toronto for filming in November 2020 due to the pandemic, but hoped that conditions would be safer in May 2021 to allow her to travel for the second block; Notaro confirmed in May 2021 that she was in Toronto to film all of her scenes for the season over two weeks. Notaro is credited as a main cast member for her appearances in the season. Despite Tilly leaving Discovery in the fourth episode, Wiseman remained a series regular and returned for the season finale.

Other guest stars reprising their roles from the third season include Oded Fehr as Admiral Charles Vance, Ian Alexander as Gray Tal, Bill Irwin as Su'Kal, Tara Rosling as Ni'Var President T'Rina, Annabelle Wallis as the voice of Zora, Sonja Sohn as Burnham's mother, Gabrielle, David Cronenberg as Dr. Kovich, Phumzile Sitole as Earth General Diatta Ndoye, and former main cast member Rachael Ancheril as Commander Nhan. Kenneth Mitchell, who made guest appearances as different characters in the previous seasons, said in August 2021 that he would have a unique role in the fourth season after the progression of his ALS diagnosis limited his ability to move and speak un-aided; he is represented by the USS Mitchell, a starship named for the actor that appears in the season finale. New recurring guests for the season include Chelah Horsdal as Laira Rillak, the Federation President, Shawn Doyle as Ruon Tarka, and Hiro Kanagawa as Dr. Hirai. In the season finale, politician and activist Stacey Abrams appears as the President of United Earth. Paradise and Kurtzman had contacted Abrams about making the appearance knowing that she was already a fan of the series and franchise, and they did not include her name in documentation for filming to help keep her role a secret.

Additionally, Osric Chau portrays Tarka's missing friend Oros, Rothaford Gray is introduced as Book's father Tareckx, and Ache Hernandez and Luca Doulgeris return as Book's brother Kyheem and nephew Leto, respectively. The crew of Discovery also return for the season, including Emily Coutts as pilot Keyla Detmer, Patrick Kwok-Choon as tactical officer Gen Rhys, Oyin Oladejo as operations officer Joann Owosekun, Ronnie Rowe Jr. as communications officer R.A. Bryce, Sara Mitich as Nilsson, David Benjamin Tomlinson as Linus the Saurian, and Raven Dauda as Dr. Tracy Pollard. Rowe has a smaller role than previously after being cast in the series The Porter, and Bryce is replaced as communications officer in some episodes by Christopher, who is portrayed by Orville Cummings.

Design
The crew of the Discovery were given the primarily gray uniforms of other 32nd-century Starfleet officers at the end of the third season, but the producers soon realized that those costumes clashed with the Discoverys existing gray hallway sets. Costume designer Gersha Phillips looked at various options that still kept the gray color and settled on more colorful costumes that have a gray stripe on the front. The uniforms use the same primary colors as Star Trek: The Next Generation (red for command, gold for operations, and blue for science) but with white uniforms for medical officers like in previous Discovery seasons. The new uniforms also have matching dress-uniform variants. The EV spacesuits seen in the season are the sixth or seventh iteration designed for the series. Phillips said they wanted each version to be more sleek and more comfortable than the last.

For the first episode's opening sequence, Phillips mistakenly assumed that Burnham's mission with Book was a courier mission and designed a leather coat for Martin-Green to wear. The producers corrected her that it was actually a Starfleet mission but asked her to keep the coat and just make it "cleaner" and Starfleet-appropriate. Martin-Green loved wearing the coat and felt it showed Burnham's "boldness" now that she is captain, while Phillips noted that it was now available to use as a uniform-variant for all Starfleet officers on the series. The Kelpien costumes on Kaminar were designed to be more organic than the Starfleet uniforms, but Phillips still wanted them to be sleek to match the aesthetic of the 32nd century. Saru wears a special pin on his chest to represent that he is a councilmember on Kaminar, and prop master Mario Moreira explained that the pin was designed to reflect Kaminar's two cultures which have united since the earlier seasons: a central stone represents the obelisks of the Ba'ul people, surrounded by flowing lines that evoke the Kelpiens' movements and the seaweed that they collect. The props department questioned whether Saru should continue to wear this pin once he returns to his Starfleet uniform but realized that there was precedent for this in the cultural baldric worn by Worf in The Next Generation. Zora and Gray play a Trill board game in "Stormy Weather" that was designed by Moreira's team to be a futuristic version of chess. He said there were many discussions about the design and rules for the game. For the casino in "All In", writer Sean Cochran used his father's knowledge as a gambling expert along with a hired consultant to help inform what details were needed on set. The props team played all of the card games before filming, reverse-engineered from the desired results, to ensure that the cards could be played in the correct order by the actors during filming. The set for the casino was a re-dressing of the space station set from the first episode.

The producers wanted to match the writers' unique approach to Species 10-C by designing creatures that did not look like any other aliens from science fiction, working with Glenn Hetrick of Alchemy Studio, who provides special makeup and prosthetics for the series, and creature designer Neville Page to create them. Executive producer and producing director Olatunde Osunsanmi did not want the creatures to be able to walk, and thought was put into what a creature would biologically need to be able to float. Osunsanmi also wanted them to be "skyscraper tall", but their size had to be reduced so they could still fit in frame with the humanoid characters.

Filming
Filming began at Pinewood Toronto Studios in Toronto, Canada, on November 2, 2020, under the working title Mill Street. Production was previously expected to take place from July 2020 to January 2021, filming back-to-back with a potential fifth season, but these plans were delayed by the COVID-19 pandemic. Kurtzman said in October 2020 that filming would be a "systematised, militarised operation" due to the pandemic, explaining that the season's crew would work in "pods" to minimize the potential spread of the virus. The cast traveled to Toronto early to quarantine for 14 days, per the Canadian government's requirements, and during filming the cast and crew were tested for COVID-19 three times a week. Jones said filming was slower because of the precautions taken on set; each episode took one day longer to film than in previous seasons.

Kurtzman revealed in October 2020 that Paramount+ was constructing a video wall to allow for virtual production on the season as well as the series Star Trek: Strange New Worlds, utilizing technology similar to the StageCraft system that was developed for the Disney+ series The Mandalorian. The new virtual set was built in Toronto by visual effects company Pixomondo, and features a 270-degree,  by  horseshoe-shaped LED volume with additional LED panels in the ceiling to aid with lighting. The technology uses the game engine software Unreal Engine to display computer-generated backgrounds on the LED screens in real-time during filming, which visual effects supervisor Jason Zimmerman noted was especially useful for creating the planets that are visited in the series; due to the pandemic, the production was unable to film on location outside of North America to portray alien planets as they did for the third season. The virtual stage was still being installed by the time production took a break for Christmas in late December. The majority of filming for the first two episodes had been completed by then, but scenes requiring the video wall were set to be filmed after the break once the technology was ready. Zimmerman oversaw the installation and use of the volume remotely from Los Angeles, and said the production design and art departments were involved with the visual effects earlier than usual since they needed to be ready for filming in the volume. Doug McCullough took over as production designer for the season, and used the technology to create environments that otherwise would not have been possible, such as the large prison in "The Examples". Other virtual locations included the Discovery shuttle bay (which appeared in previous seasons without the technology), the Kaminar Council Chamber, and the Federation Headquarters shuttle bay. Almost every episode of the season used virtual production for at least one scene.

Philip Lanyon was the lead director of photography for the season after previously working on an episode of Discovery second season and also serving as lead director of photography for the first season of Star Trek: Picard. Franco Tata and Chris Mably were also cinematographers for the fourth season. Lanyon began his work on the season by developing a "visual mood board" for the cinematography with Osunsanmi. The season was filmed with Arri Alexa Mini, Mini LF, and SXT cameras, and Lanyon brought back Cooke Optics' Anamorphic/i Special Flare lenses from his previous Star Trek work because they gave him control over the lens flares that arise from all of the practical light on the Discovery sets. He also chose to start using Anamorphic/i Full Frame Plus SF lenses on the season, believing that the full frame format of those lenses created a cleaner image and allowed him to get closer to the actors with a wider field of view without distorting the image in the way that some wide-angle lenses do. The full frame lenses were just used for the virtual production scenes on the season's first eleven episodes, and the softer backgrounds created by the lenses helped control artefacts from the LED screens such as moiré patterns. Lanyon and Osunsanmi then used the full frame format as the primary lenses for the last two episodes of the season. Lanyon felt the cinematography for the season, especially with the addition of virtual production, gave it a "bigger world" with a different visual style when compared to the first three seasons. Coincidentally, cinematographer Glen Keenan chose to use the full frame lenses on Strange New Worlds around the same time that Lanyon selected them for this season.

Film composer and editor John Ottman, a big Star Trek fan, directed the fourth episode of the season. Ottman helped Kurtzman oversee the editing of the third season in return for getting to direct in the fourth. On April 22, 2021, production on the season was paused after a "Zone A" individual (referring to key cast members as well as the crew who are in contact with them) came in "close proximity" away from set with someone who tested positive for COVID-19. This was detected through Ontario's contact tracing system, and the individual began 14 days of quarantine. The rest of the season's almost 80-person production were not required to quarantine and filming was set to start again on May 6. There was also a lockdown in the Toronto area at that time, but film and television productions were allowed to continue. One of the series' pandemic protocols saw the bridge crew of Discovery rotated so the same actors would not always be on set. This is explained in the series by Burnham requiring all crewmembers to take time off for their mental and emotional health. Production for the season was originally set to end on June 10, but pandemic delays meant this end date was extended to August or September. In mid-July, Martin-Green said they had "a little bit more [filming] to do" for the season, and much of the cast wrapped for the season by early August. It was during August that Abrams travelled to Toronto to film her appearance for the finale, and she requested that the cast and crew not spoil the events of the season for her so she could still watch it as a fan. Paradise travelled to Toronto on August 9 for the final weeks of pickup shots and location shooting, and announced that filming for the season had been completed on August 23.

Visual effects
In addition to working on the season's virtual production effects throughout pre-production and filming, Pixomondo also provided "post-shoot touchup work" to remove the seams between the video wall and ceiling, as well as traditional visual effects such as digital matte paintings. Other visual effects vendors for the season included Crafty Apes VFX, Outpost VFX, Switch VFX, and Gradient Effects. Outpost worked on episodes eight and nine, creating the dead planet that Book and Tarka hide near and adapting the series' programmable matter effects—which were developed by Pixomondo for the third season—to be used as a weapon by Tarka.

Music
Composer Jeff Russo confirmed in December 2020 that he would begin work on the fourth season once the third season was completed. By April 2021, he was considering using musical themes in the season that he had composed for Noah Hawley's planned Star Trek film before that project was put on pause in August 2020. "Stormy Weather" features Wallis's Zora singing the song of the same name, first sung by Ethel Waters in 1933. This song was included on a soundtrack album for the season alongside selections from Russo's score. The album was released digitally by Lakeshore Records on August 26, 2022. All music by Jeff Russo:

Marketing
In February 2021, Martin-Green appeared in a marketing campaign for Super Bowl LV advertising the rebranded streaming service Paramount+. Martin-Green then revealed the first teaser for the season during a panel for the "First Contact Day" virtual event on April 5, 2021, celebrating the franchise on the fictional holiday marking first contact between humans and aliens in the Star Trek universe. The teaser revealed the season's new uniforms. A full trailer and key art poster were revealed during a panel for the season at New York Comic-Con in October. Multiple commentators discussing the trailer highlighted Burnham's new role as captain. Scott Snowden at Space.com felt the approach to Burnham had not changed despite the promotion and said the trailer's premise of "a strange anomaly threatens the entire galaxy" was essentially the same as the third season's story.

Release

Streaming and broadcast
The season premiered on Paramount+ in the United States on November 18, 2021, and the first seven episodes were released through December 30. The remaining six episodes were released from February 10 to March 17, 2022. Bell Media broadcast the season in Canada on the specialty channels CTV Sci-Fi Channel (English) and Z (French) on the same day as the U.S., before streaming episodes on Crave.

Netflix originally held the streaming rights for the season in another 188 countries as with the previous seasons, but two days before the season's international debut, ViacomCBS announced that it had bought back the international streaming rights to Discovery from Netflix effective immediately. This meant the season would be streamed in other countries on Paramount+ once the service was available there some time in 2022. The announcement led to backlash from international fans for its timing and the fact that the season would not be available in other countries at the same time as it was released in the U.S. and Canada. On November 24, ViacomCBS acknowledged the backlash and said the season would be made available internationally through several avenues: it would begin releasing on Paramount+ for markets where the service had already launched, starting with the first two episodes on November 26; episodes would air multiple times a week on the free streaming service Pluto TV in other territories; and episodes would be available for digital purchase in some countries.

Home media
The season was released on DVD, Blu-Ray, and Limited Edition Steelbook formats in the U.S. on December 6, 2022. The release includes over 90 minutes of bonus features, including deleted scenes, a gag reel, audio commentary for the season finale, and featurettes on the making of the season, filming during the COVID-19 pandemic, Burnham becoming captain, and the introduction of virtual production technology.

Reception

Viewership
In December 2021, Paramount+ revealed that Star Trek: Discovery was the most watched series on the streaming service for its inaugural year. Audience demand analytics company Parrot Analytics, who estimate streaming viewership based on global "demand expressions", listed Discovery as the 15th most in-demand streaming series of 2021 and calculated that it was 19 times more in-demand than the average United States series. It was the only Paramount+ series in Parrot's top 20 list for the year. Whip Media, who track viewership data for the 19 million worldwide users of their TV Time app, ranked Discovery in the top 10 original streaming series for U.S. viewership the week of the season's premiere, as well as each week from the third episode's release until the end of the season's first half. The series returned to the top 10 list for the release of the season's last four episodes. According to anti-piracy analytics firm MUSO, who measure global unlicensed streaming and torrent data, the fourth season of Discovery was one of the 10 most-pirated series in November and December 2021.

Critical response
The review aggregator website Rotten Tomatoes reported 88% approval with an average rating of 7.70/10 based on 17 reviews. The website's critical consensus reads, "Michael Burnham finally comes into her own—and so does Discovery—in a confident fourth season that embraces the series' more heartfelt take on the Star Trek mythos."

Accolades
The season is one of 200 television series that received the ReFrame Stamp for the years 2021 to 2022. The stamp is awarded by the gender equity coalition ReFrame and industry database IMDbPro for film and television projects that are proven to have gender-balanced hiring, with stamps being awarded to projects that hire female-identifying people, especially women of color, in four out of eight key roles for their production.

Notes

References

External links 
 
 

4
Fiction set in the 4th millennium
Television series set in the future
2021 American television seasons
2022 American television seasons
Split television seasons